The Canaanite “Hebrew” alphabet is a language the Aramaic alphabet was derived from taking place during the Persian, Hellenistic and Roman periods (c. 500 BC – 50 AD). It replaced the Paleo-Hebrew alphabet which was used in the earliest epigraphic records of the Hebrew language.

History

The history of the Hebrew alphabet is not to be confused with the history of the Paleo-Hebrew alphabet, so called not because it is ancestral to the Hebrew  alphabet but because it was used to write the earliest form of the Hebrew language.

"Paleo-Hebrew alphabet" is the modern term (coined by Solomon Birnbaum in 1954) used for the script otherwise known as the Phoenician alphabet when used to write Hebrew, or when found in the context of the ancient Israelite kingdoms. This script was used in the kingdoms of Israel and Judah as well as throughout Canaan more generally, during the 10th to 7th centuries BCE. By the 6th or 5th centuries, this script had diverged into numerous national variants, the most successful of these being the Aramaic script, which came to be widely adopted in the Persian empire.

Following the Babylonian exile, the Jews gradually stopped using the Paleo-Hebrew script, and instead adopted a "square" form of the Aramaic alphabet. A similar "square Aramaic script" is still used for contemporary western dialects of Aramaic (Western Neo-Aramaic).

This "square" variant of Aramaic developed into the Hebrew alphabet proper during the Second Temple period, in a process that was not complete before the 1st century CE; for example, the letter samekh developed its closed or circular form only  in the middle Hasmonean period, around 100 BCE, and this variant becomes the standard form  in early Herodian hands, in the 1st century CE.

The Samaritan alphabet, on the other hand, remains a direct descendant of the Paleo-Hebrew script. 

The Hebrew alphabet was later adapted in order to write down the languages of the Jewish diaspora (Karaim, Judæo-Arabic, Ladino, Yiddish, etc.), and was retained all the while in relatively unadapted form throughout the diaspora for Hebrew, which remained the language of Jewish law, scriptures and scholarship. The Hebrew alphabet was also retained as the alphabet used for writing down the Hebrew language during its rebirth as an everyday modern language starting in the 18th to 19th century.

Talmudic views
In the Talmud, the Paleo-Hebrew script is known as the Libona'a, associated with the Samaritan community who continued to preserve the script, and the Hebrew script is known as the Ashurith, associated with Assyria.

The Talmudic sages did not share a uniform stance on the subject the development of the Hebrew alphabet. Some claimed that Paleo-Hebrew was the original script used by the Israelites at the time of the Exodus, According to this  tradition, the block script seen today in Hebrew Torah Scrolls, called the "Assyrian script" (Kthav Ashurith) in the Talmud, was the original Hebrew script carved into the Ten Commandments.

Others believed that Paleo-Hebrew merely served as a stopgap in a time when the ostensibly original script (the Hebrew alphabet) had been lost. According to both opinions, Ezra the Scribe (c. 500 BCE) introduced, or reintroduced the Assyrian script to be used as the primary alphabet for the Hebrew language. The arguments given for both opinions are rooted in Jewish scripture and/or tradition.

A third opinion in the Talmud states that the script never changed altogether. It would seem that the sage who expressed this opinion did not believe that Paleo-Hebrew ever existed, despite the strong arguments supporting it. His stance is rooted in a scriptural verse, which makes reference to the shape of the letter vav. The sage argues further that, given the commandment to copy a Torah scroll directly from another, the script could not conceivably have been modified at any point. This third opinion was accepted by some early Jewish scholars, and rejected by others, partially because it was permitted to write the Torah in Greek.

Ancestral scripts and script variants

Gallery

See also
 Cursive Hebrew
 Rashi script
 Vaybertaytsh
 Solitreo
 Proto-Sinaitic alphabet
 Phoenician alphabet
 Paleo-Hebrew alphabet
 Aramaic alphabet

References

Hebrew alphabet